"I Like You" is 1985 dance single by Philadelphia-born singer, Phyllis Nelson.  The single was number one on the dance charts for one week.  "I Like You"  also crossed over the soul chart where it peaked at #65 and #61 on the Hot 100, respectively.  The single was her sole entry into both the pop and soul charts, and the last of two chart entries on the dance chart for her.

A music video was also made for the track, portraying Nelson performing the song on a piano to a young boy in a dancing studio, along with scenes of men at a pool bar and Nelson in a relationship with a man outside on the streets.

Chart positions

References

1985 singles
1984 songs
Song articles with missing songwriters